Jan Pettersson (born 31 January 1961) is a Swedish sports shooter. He competed in the men's 50 metre running target event at the 1988 Summer Olympics.

References

1961 births
Living people
Swedish male sport shooters
Olympic shooters of Sweden
Shooters at the 1988 Summer Olympics
People from Dalarna